Ivo James Benedict Stourton (born 1982) is a British author and solicitor.

Career
Stourton first came into the public eye at the age of 17 when he wrote and starred in Kassandra, an award-winning Edinburgh Festival production about the Vietnam war.

In June 2006 he was signed to a two-book deal by Random House. His first book, The Night Climbers a novel about a secret society in Cambridge and a group of friends who get involved in art fraud, was published on 4 June 2007, and is partly based on the infamous student practice of "night climbing". The Night Climbers was published in the United States by Simon Spotlight Entertainment on 7 September 2007.

His second novel, The Book Lover's Tale, was published in June 2011. His third, The Happier Dead, was published in 2014.

Personal life
The eldest child of Edward Stourton and his first wife, Margaret (née McEwen), Ivo attended Eton College and was a member of the Eton Society alongside Prince William and actor Eddie Redmayne. He graduated with a double first in English from Corpus Christi College, Cambridge. His younger brother Tom also attended Eton and is a comedian.

Stourton entered the BPP Law School and is an associate at Slaughter and May.

Bibliography
Stourton, Ivo (2007). The Night Climbers. London: Doubleday. According to WorldCat, the book is held in 725 libraries, and has been translated into German, Dutch, and Russian.
Stourton, Ivo (2011). The Book Lover's Tale. London: Doubleday. . According to WorldCat, the book is held in 217 libraries 
Stourton, Ivo (2014). The Happier Dead Oxford, UK: Solaris. According to WorldCat, the book is held in 112 libraries

References

External links
BookVideos.tv video interview with the author about The Night Climbers

Living people
1982 births
English writers
English solicitors
People educated at Eton College
Alumni of Corpus Christi College, Cambridge
English male novelists